Jiang Jinfu (born 2 September 1991) is a Chinese actor and model.

Life and career
Jiang was born in Changsha, Hunan, China on 2 September 1991. After graduating from Yali High School, he attended Shanghai Theatre Academy in 2009 and graduated in 2013. Jiang worked as a print model before entering entertainment industry, and one of his most well-known modeling works included the Chinese fiction The Left Ear. In 2011, Jiang signed a contract with Tangren Media, and gained massive attention after starring as the leading actor in the 2012 drama Xuan-Yuan Sword: Scar of Sky.

In 2015, Jiang embarked a conflict with his agent company Tangren Media and set up his own studio.  In 2018, Jiang decided to study abroad in Japan, and suspended his acting career.

Controversy
On November 20, 2018, Jiang was revealed to have engaged in domestic abuse toward his ex-girlfriend through a self-admittance post on Weibo.

On November 28, police in Japan issued an arrest warrant for Jiang, who was suspected of crime of intentional injury and domestic violence. On November 30, Jiang turned himself in to the police.

On January 9, 2019, Jiang was released  from police custody in Japan, and the domestic violence charges against him were dropped.

Filmography

Film

Television series

Variety show

References 

1991 births
Living people
21st-century Chinese male actors
Chinese male television actors
Male actors from Changsha
Shanghai Theatre Academy alumni
Chinese male film actors